Spiking is the act of withholding a story from publication for editorial, commercial, or political reasons.  Its facts and grammar may be valid, but its content is deemed to be at odds with the interests of the paper, or the paper's interpretation of what is good for its community.  A spiking may be permanent, or temporary, depending on what instigated it, and whether the objection(s) can be overcome.

Some examples would be a story that while factually correct would likely incite a powerful local politician, upset a valuable advertiser in that paper, or bring unwanted attention to a community.  The editorial staff, or if preempted, the newspaper ownership or management, must balance all its interests against purely theoretical "journalistic integrity".  Conflicts involving spiking often arise from stories being pursued as part of investigative journalism, or which threaten to bring on a libel lawsuit (that could prove expensive to fight even if groundless).  Also late suspicions of plagiarism or other ethical violations on the part of the author, however brought to an editor's attention.

Spiking is not limited to print media, as stories for radio or television broadcast also are subject to it for the same reasons.

External links 
 Harold Evans, memoirs of the future: The Spike, Mr Bow-Tie and other Fleet Street legends. The Times Literary Supplement,September 16, 2009.

Journalism terminology